The Keg 2002 Continental Cup of Curling was held at the Agridome in Regina, Saskatchewan November 7–10. It was the very first edition of the event. North America defeated their European counterparts 207-193. Despite the fact that all the teams were from Europe, North America's opposition was known as Team World. Later events would name the team "Team Europe" until 2008, when "Team World" was re-adopted after the inclusion of Chinese teams.

Teams

World
 Luzia Ebnöther, Carmen Küng, Tanya Frei, Nadia Röthlisberger
 Elisabet Gustafson, Katarina Nyberg, Louise Marmont, Elisabeth Persson
 Peja Lindholm, Tomas Nordin, Magnus Swartling, Peter Narup
 Hammy McMillan, Norman Brown, Hugh Aitken, Roger McIntyre
 Rhona Martin, Debbie Knox, Fiona MacDonald, Janice Rankin
 Pål Trulsen, Lars Vågberg, Flemming Davanger, Bent Ånund Ramsfjell

North America
 David Nedohin, Randy Ferbey, Scott Pfeifer, Marcel Rocque 
 Colleen Jones, Kim Kelly, Mary-Anne Waye, Nancy Delahunt
 Patti Lank, Erika Brown, Nicole Joraanstad, Natalie Nicholson
 Kelley Law, Julie Skinner, Georgina Wheatcroft, Diane Dezura 
 Kevin Martin, Don Walchuk, Carter Rycroft, Don Bartlett
 Paul Pustovar, Mike Fraboni, Geoff Goodland, Richard Maskel

Mixed doubles
(Each game worth six points)

World (Vågberg/Ebnöther) 9-6 North America (Walchuk/Law)
World (Nordin/Gustafson) 7-5 North America (Ferbey/Jones)
World (Brown/R. Martin) 6-2 North America (Fraboni/Lank)
World (Lindholm/Nyberg) 6-1 North America (K. Martin/Skinner)
North America (Pustovar/E. Brown) 5-4 World (McMillan/Knox)
North America (Nedohin/Kelly) 9-2 World (Trulsen/Küng)

World wins 24-12

Women's team
(Each game worth six points)

World (R. Martin) 9-2 North America (Law)
North America (Lank) 8-4 World (Gustafson)
North America (Jones) 5-2 World (Ebnöther)
North America (Lank) 8-6 World (Ebnöther)
North America (Jones) 5-4 World (Gustafson)
World (R. Martin) 7-3 North America (Law)

North America wins 24-12

Men's team
(Each game worth six points)

North America (Pustovar) 8-4 World (McMillan)
World (Lindholm) 8-4 North America (Ferbey)
North America (K. Martin) 6-5 World (Trulsen)
World (Lindholm) 7-6 North America (Pustovar)
North America (Ferbey) 8-3 World (Trulsen)
North America (K. Martin) 4-2 World (McMillan)

North America wins 24-12

Singles
(Each game worth two points, eight bonus points awarded to top aggregate score)

World (Nyberg) 24-12 North America (Waye)
World (MacDonald) 17-14 North America (E. Brown)
North America (Wheatcroft) 14-10 World (Frei)
North America (Pfeifer) 22-19 World (Narup)
North America (Goodland) 20-13 World (McIntyre)
World (Ramsfjell) 16-15 North America (Walchuk) 
World (Knox) 17-11 North America (Jones)
World (Küng) 19-15 North America (Lank)
World (Gustafson) 20-15 North America (Law)
North America (K. Martin) 27-13 World (Swartling)
World (Aitken) 20-17 North America (Pustovar)
World (Davanger) 22-21 North America (Nedohin)

World wins 24-8

Women's skins

North America wins 66–64

Men's skins

North America wins 73–57

North America wins aggregate 207–193

External links
Internet Archives - World Curling Federation 

Curling
Continental Cup of Curling
Sports competitions in Regina, Saskatchewan
Curling in Saskatchewan
2002 in Canadian curling
2002 in Saskatchewan